Owen J. Bush Stadium was a baseball stadium in Indianapolis, Indiana, United States. It was home to the Indianapolis Indians from 1931 to 1996. It was also home to a few Negro league teams, as well as a Continental Football League team, the Indianapolis Capitols, who won the league's final championship in 1969.

History
The stadium was built by Norm Perry, owner of the Indians, in 1931. He named it Perry Stadium as a memorial to his brother Jim, the former owner of the club who had died in plane crash a few years earlier. Construction was completed by Osborn Engineering, who also constructed Fenway Park and other steel-and-concrete ballparks of that era. The Indians played their first game in the ballpark on September 5, 1931. 

It was renamed Victory Field on January 21, 1942, in response to the onset of World War II. The name was the winning entry of a fan contest held by the club's new owners. The day of its renaming, the Indianapolis News stated that the renaming was chosen "because of its timeliness with current affairs; its popularity among [contest] proposals; and its possibilities for elaborate public displays".

In 1967 the ballpark was sold to the city of Indianapolis, who leased it back to the Indians. On August 30, 1967, it was renamed for former major league baseball player and Indianapolis native Donie Bush, who had served as president of the Indians from 1955 to 1969.

English ivy was planted on the brick outfield walls of Perry Stadium prior to its opening. P. K. Wrigley liked the appearance of the ivy, and subsequently instructed the iconic Wrigley Field ivy in Chicago to be planted. The ivy in Indianapolis remained after the stadium became Victory Field and then Bush Stadium, but was discontinued in 1996, when the Indians moved to the current Victory Field ballpark downtown.

During the 1930s, Perry Stadium was home to many Negro league teams. These included the ABCs (1932, 1938, and 1939), American Giants (1933), Athletics (1937) and Crawfords (1940). Later, it would be home to the Indianapolis Clowns, a barnstorming team that was well known for "comical antics". The Clowns won the Negro American League championship in 1952, with the help of Hank Aaron. They played in Indianapolis from 1944 to 1962. Later, the Clowns featured Toni Stone, the first female Negro leagues player in history. Even after the Indianapolis Indians integrated in 1952, the Clowns continued to play at the stadium.

In 1987, Bush Stadium was dressed up in different ways to be used as the stand-in for both Comiskey Park and Crosley Field during the filming of Eight Men Out, which was about the "Black Sox Scandal", the throwing of the 1919 World Series.

Indianapolis hosted the Pan Am Games in 1987, and the baseball tournament was held at Bush Stadium.

In mid-season 1996, the Indians left Bush Stadium for the new Victory Field at White River State Park. In 1997, Tony George, president of the nearby Indianapolis Motor Speedway, leased the property and converted it into a dirt track named the 16th Street Speedway for midget car auto racing. The ivy was removed from the outfield walls around this time. As happened with a similar venture involving Philadelphia's Baker Bowl several decades earlier, the auto racing venture failed (after two years). The property closed and the stadium fell into disrepair, with no apparent future. The Indy Parks Department had control of the land, which was zoned as a park. At the time, it was estimated that renovations, which would include removal of asbestos and lead paint, could cost around $10 million.

Between 2008 and 2011 the Stadium was used as a storage site for cars traded in as part of the Cash for Clunkers program.

In 2011 it was proposed the stadium be turned into an apartment complex, and on March 15, 2012, demolition began on portions of the 81-year-old structure. The 138 loft units were completely leased when the complex opened on July 27, 2013. The dirt portion of the infield has now been paved with stamped red concrete, but the lights that lit up the field at night still stand. Much of the exterior facade has been preserved, and many of the historic features, such as the owner's suite and the ticket booth, have been incorporated into the loft apartments. There are studio, one, and two-bedroom units in the complex. The cost of the project was $13 million, of which the city funded $5 million. The Stadium Lofts complex includes both the loft apartments within the former stadium building and newly constructed flats.

Dimensions

Original

Left Field – 
Left Center Field – 
Center Field Corner – 
Right Center Field – 
Right Field – 

1945 (home plate moved about 20 feet toward center field)

Left Field – 
Left Center Field – 
Center Field Corner – 
Right Center Field – 
Right Field – 

1967 (inner fence constructed across center field)

Left Field – 
Left Center Field – 
Deep Left Center – 
Center Field Inner Fence – 
Deep Right Center – 
Right Center Field – 
Right Field –

See also
List of baseball parks in Indianapolis
List of International League stadiums

References

Footnotes

Sources
Ballparks of North America, by Michael Benson.

External links

Minor league ballparks page
Decaying Diamond by IndyStar

Official site of the new Victory Field
Photos of the interior in 2011 from Abandoned Indiana
Stadium lofts story

Defunct baseball venues in the United States
Baseball venues in Indiana
Sports venues in Indianapolis
Indianapolis Indians
Historic American Landscapes Survey in Indiana
National Register of Historic Places in Indianapolis
Art Deco architecture in Indiana
Negro league baseball venues still standing
Negro league baseball venues
Defunct minor league baseball venues
1931 establishments in Indiana
Sports venues on the National Register of Historic Places in Indiana
Sports venues completed in 1931
Defunct sports venues in Indiana